Belon or Belón may refer to:
Riec-sur-Bélon, a commune in the Finistère department of Brittany, France
Estadio E. Torres Belón, a multi-purpose stadium in Puno, Peru
María Belón (born 1966), Spanish physician and motivational speaker
Pierre Belon (1517–1564), French traveller, naturalist, writer and diplomat
Pierre Belon Lapisse (1762–1809), French military personnel
Valentin Belon (born 1995), French footballer
Wojciech Belon (1952–1985), Polish poet, songwriter and folksinger

See also
Belon'i Tsiribihina, a town and commune in Madagascar
Belon'i Tsiribihina (district), a district in Menabe, Madagascar

French-language surnames
Spanish-language surnames